Gyeongju Citizen FC was a South Korean football club based in the city of Gyeongju. It is a former member of the K3 League, the third tier of league football in South Korea until 2020 season.

Honours
K3 League 
Winners (1): 2010
Runners-up (1): 2015

K3 League Challengers League
Winners (1): 2011

K3 League Advanced
Winners (1): 2018

Season-by-season records

See also
 List of football clubs in South Korea

References

External links
 Official website 

K3 League clubs
Defunct football clubs in South Korea
Football clubs in North Gyeongsang Province
Gyeongju
2007 establishments in South Korea
2020 disestablishments in South Korea
Association football clubs established in 2007
Association football clubs disestablished in 2020